Cannabis in Ukraine is illegal, but the country is in process to a legalization of cannabis for medical purposes.

In April 2021, some THC- and CBD-containing drugs were approved for medical use (namely Dronabinol and Nabiximols).

History
Soviet Ukraine was one of the biggest producers of hemp, and before the 1950s, it had over 150.000 hectares dedicated to hemp cultivation. Cannabis wasn't widely used as a recreational drug in Soviet Ukraine, most of the grown hemp would be used for its other natural resources such as oil and fiber.

Enforcement
According to Article 106-2 Code of Administrative Offences Ukraine, cultivation (without intent to sell) up to 10 cannabis plants qualifies as an administrative violation, with a fine of from 18 to 100 non-taxable income units (300-1700 hryvnia in 2011) and the seizure of plants.

The limit for possession without intent to sell, for which no criminal liability is given, is up to 5 grams of cannabis. However, there are plans to raise this limit to 10 grams.

Reform

2017 Cannabis March of Freedom 
A march was planned for October 28, 2017, taking place near the Government of Ukraine.

2019 Process of legalization medical cannabis in Ukraine. 

On January 30, Ukrainian Association of Medical Cannabis created the petition with the backing of 16 public organizations on the Verkhovna Rada website. The petition said that medical cannabis could greatly help over two million Ukrainians suffering from a wide range of ailments, including epilepsy, cancer and post-traumatic stress disorder. Acting Health Minister Ulana Suprun supported petition and called for the promotion of legalization medical cannabis.

In March, petition got all needed 25,000 drawn signatures for consideration by the Parliamentary Committee. Subsequently, Parliamentary Committee on Human Rights, National Minorities and Interethnic Relations unanimously supported petition and it was registered in the Ukrainian Parliament on May 20.

The legalization of medical cannabis - was supported by the President of Ukraine Volodymyr Zelensky in an interview to RBC-Ukraine on April 18.

2020 Ukrainians support medical cannabis in national poll. 
October 25 President Zelenskyy announces nationwide poll. The fourth question is: “Do you support the legalization of cannabis for medical purposes – to reduce pain in critically ill patients?” Former Minister of Health Ulana Suprun wrote on her official Facebook page that “Cannabis should be available to all patients who need it. There are about 2 million such patients in Ukraine.”
64.88% of the participants answered “yes”, 29.53% - “no”.

References

Further reading

 
Ukraine